Logar (Dari: ; meaning Greater Mountain ( لوې غر) is one of the 34 provinces of Afghanistan located in the eastern section of the country. It is divided into 7 districts and contains hundreds of villages. Ahmadzai Pashtuns are influential in this region. Puli Alam is the capital of the province. As of 2021, Logar has a population of approximately 442,037. It is a multi-ethnic tribal society, with a 60% Tajik majority.

The Logar River enters the province through the west and leaves to the north.

History

Pre Islamic era 

A 2,600-year-old a Zoroastrian fire temple was found at Mes Aynak (about 25 miles or 40  kilometers southeast of Kabul). Several Buddhist stupas and more than 1,000 statues were also found. Smelting workshops, miners’ quarters (even then the site's copper was well known), a mint, two small forts, a citadel, and a stockpile of Kushan, Sassanian and Indo-Parthian coins were also found at the site.

Recent history 
During the Soviet–Afghan War, Logar was known among some Afghans as the Bab al-Jihad (Gates of Jihad) because it became a fierce theatre of war between US-backed/trained mujahideen groups and the Soviet-backed Afghan government troops. Ahmadzai Suleman Khel Ghilzai Pashtuns is dominant in this region. Haji Shuja, Haji Zareen and Haji Bahadur were the prominent traders and chieftains in the region before the soviet invasion of Afghanistan. It was one of the main supply routes of mujahideen rebels coming from Pakistan. Like other parts of the country, Logar has also seen heavy fighting since the Soviets started a crackdown against the elders of the Ahmadzai tribe during the 1980s.  Swedish journalist Borge Almqvist, who visited the province in 1982, wrote that: "Everywhere in the Logar province the most common sight except for ruins are graves". Soviet operations included using bombing, the use of flammable liquids to burn alive people in hiding, poisoning of drinking water, and destruction of crops and farmland. One writer who witnessed the events argues that the Soviet actions in Logar amounted to genocide.

By 1995, the province had fallen to the Taliban government. After the removal of the Taliban and the formation of the Karzai administration in late 2001, the International Security Assistance Force (ISAF) and Afghan National Security Forces (ANSF) gradually took over security of the area. The Provincial Reconstruction Team Logar (PRT Logar) was established in March 2008. It provided several benefits to the locals, including security, development, and jobs.

In the meantime, Taliban insurgents are often causing major disturbances in the area. This includes major attacks on key projects, suicide bombings in civilian areas, and assassinations of Afghan government employees. On 19 August 2014, a major Taliban offensive took place with 700 militants aiming to take control of the province, while the NATO-led foreign force mistakenly killed three civilians in an airstrike in December 2014.

On 20 January 2019, the Taliban claimed responsibility for a car bomb attack on the province's governor and his convoy, which killed eight security forces and wounded at least 10 on the highway to Kabul. The governor and the provincial head of the National Directorate of Security were uninjured.

On 14 August 2021, the Taliban offensive reached Puli Alam (the province capital), and the province of Logar fell to the Taliban, setting their sights to Kabul the following day.

Geography 

Logar can be generally described as a relatively flat river valley in the north and central regions, surrounded by rugged mountains to the east, south, and southwest. The district of Azra, in the east, consists almost entirely of mountains, while travel to the Paktia Province to the south is limited to the Tera Pass, a 2896 m high road that was recently completed as part of the international reconstruction effort in Afghanistan. The Kabul-Khost Highway runs north–south through Logar Province, from the Mohammed Agha District.

The government of Afghanistan officially recognizes all the districts of the Logar province as part of the province.

Capital city

Puli Alam is the capital city of Logar province, located in the district of Puli Alam. It's on the main road running south and southeast from Kabul to Khost.

Rebuilding of the city is going on. There is a lot of room for infrastructure and investment.
Puli Alam has seen reconstruction since the fall of the Taliban. The main road to Kabul was completed in 2006, significantly reducing travel time to the national capital. Additional projects include numerous schools, radio stations, government facilities, and a major Afghan National Police base situated south of the city.
The city is open for investment.

Like many Afghan cities, there is municipal planning and services.
During the tenure of President Ashraf Ghani the city gained electricity, clean drinking and water facilities.

Economics 
Logar is an agricultural province with a wealth of minerals such as copper and chromite. In terms of industry, the province has one textile and one copper factory. Agriculture, commerce and services, and livestock products account for the majority of commercial operations. Agriculture is a significant source of income for 31% of households. However, commerce and services provide income to 30% of rural households, while non-farm-related labor provides income to 46% of rural households. Tobacco and sugar extract are the two most important industrial crops. The main industry is honey production, which is a small industry. Jewelry, ceramics, and carpets are made in a small number of settlements. Eighty-four percent of the province's households have access to irrigated land. Wheat, maize, potatoes, alfalfa, clover, and other feed are among the most significant field crops. Sheep, cattle, camels, and poultry are the most frequent livestock.

Healthcare 

The percentage of households without clean drinking water fell from 45% in 2005 to 14% in 2011.  
The percentage of births attended to by a skilled birth attendant increased from 9% in 2005 to 73% in 2011.

In 2008, the province of Logar has 32 health clinics and a 137-bed hospital. According to data from 2008, the Ministry of Health employs 48 doctors and 218 other health professionals in the province. There are 156 pharmacies in the province. The majority of villages do not have a permanent health worker. To access their nearest health center, the majority of the populace must travel 5 to 10 kilometers.

Education 

The overall literacy rate (6+ years of age) increased from 21% in 2005 to 30% in 2011.  
The overall net enrolment rate (6–13 years of age) increased from 22% in 2005 to 45% in 2011.

The overall literacy rate in Logar province was 21% in 2005 however, while nearly one-third (31%) of men are literate this is true for just under one-tenth (9%) of women. There are around 168 primary and secondary schools in the province catering for 81,538 students. There are nearly 2,082 teachers working in schools in the Logar province. There are several girls schools in the province, mostly located in Koshi and Pul-e-alam. Due to the large Taliban presence in Chark and Baraki Barak, the freedom of women in Logar does not always allow for an education. As of 2007, the province had a literacy rate of 17%.

There are 19 religious centers including a Dar-ul-Ulum, three Darul Hifaz and the rest are Madrasas.

Three technical and vocational high schools and two private high schools function in Logar Province.

Demographics 

As of 2021, the total population of Logar province is about 442,037. Logar is dominantly Sunni, multi-ethnic and a tribal society. Pashtuns and Tajiks  make up the majority population of Logar province, while minority.

7.2 percent of the population lived below the national poverty line, the lowest of all of Afghanistan's provinces.

In 2008, the population of Logar was estimated to be at 349,000 people. The province has 44,209 households, with an average of eight individuals per home. Rural districts are home to 72 percent of the population. Farsi/Dari is spoken by two-thirds of villages and 60% of the population, whereas Pashto is spoken by one-third of villages and 40% of the people. Kochi people(nomads) live in the province of Logar, and their numbers fluctuate with the seasons. In the winter, 96,280 people, or 4% of the Kochi people population, stay in Logar and live in 29 settlements. During the summer, the Kochi people population swells to 208,339, making Logar the province with the second-highest number of Kochi people after Kabul province.

Districts 
Until 2005 the district was administratively subdivided into five districts. In that year the province gained Azra District from neighboring Paktia Province; also part of Charkh District was split off into the new district of Kharwar.

Sport 

Cricket is the most popular sport in the province. Logar has been a major supplier of players for the Afghanistan national cricket team. Former players include Dawlat Ahmadzai, Ahmad Shah Pakteen and former national team captain Raees Ahmadzai. Among the active national players hailing from Logar are: Mohammad Nabi (captain of the national team), Shahpoor Zadran, Hashmatullah Shahidi, Nasir Jamal Ahmadzai and Gulbadin Naib Ahmadzai.

Football is the second most popular sport in the province. De Abasin Sape (meaning "Waves of Abasin") plays in the Afghanistan Premier League. Abasin means "father of the rivers" in Pashto and refers to the Indus River. The team represents the provinces of Khost, Paktia, Logar, and Paktika.

Other popular sports are volleyball, boxing, taekwondo, Washoe, kick boxing and wrestling.

See also 
 Provinces of Afghanistan
 Mes Aynak – the world's second largest copper deposit

References

External links 

Logar Province - Naval Postgraduate School
Tribal Map of Logar province on nps.edu
Logar Province ولایت لوگر 

 
Provinces of Afghanistan
Provinces of the Islamic Republic of Afghanistan